The table below lists Nigerian Senators of the 6th National Assembly.
The 6th National Assembly (2007 -2011) was inaugurated on 5 June 2007. 
The Senate includes three senators from each of the 36 states, plus one minister for the Federal Capital Territory, Abuja.
Of the 109 Senators, 26 were re-elected while 83 were elected for the first time.
David Mark was appointed president of the Senate and Ike Ekweremadu deputy president.

Senators

Election results by party

See also
Nigerian Senate

References

6th